Stipa leptogluma is a species of grass in the family Poaceae.
It is found only in Ecuador.

References

leptogluma
Flora of Ecuador
Data deficient plants
Taxonomy articles created by Polbot